Gavin Bornholdt (26 November 1947 – 12 November 2011) was a New Zealand sailor. He competed in the mixed three person keelboat event at the 1976 Summer Olympics.

References

External links
 

1947 births
2011 deaths
New Zealand male sailors (sport)
Olympic sailors of New Zealand
Sportspeople from Lower Hutt
Sailors at the 1976 Summer Olympics – Soling